Claude John Kelly III (born April 30, 1961) is the Chief Federal Defender for the Eastern District of Louisiana and is a former nominee to be a United States district judge of the United States District Court for the Eastern District of Louisiana.

Biography

Kelly received a Bachelor of Arts degree in 1983 from the College of the Holy Cross. He received a Juris Doctor in 1987 from Tulane University Law School. He began his legal career as an Assistant District Attorney with the New Orleans District Attorney's Office, from 1987 to 1990. He interrupted his legal career to serve as General Manager of his family's restaurant, Kolb's German Restaurant, from 1990 to 1992. He served as an Assistant Federal Public Defender in the Eastern District of Louisiana, from 1992 to 2000. He served as the Director of International Sales for Optimal Healthcare in Miami, Florida, from 2000 to 2002 and as a consultant for the International Exchange Group in Washington, D.C., from 2002 to 2006. From 2006 to 2014, he was in private practice as a solo practitioner, concentrating on criminal defense. Since 2014, he has served as the Chief Federal Defender in the Federal Public Defender's Office for the Eastern District of Louisiana.

Expired nomination to district court

On February 4, 2016, President Obama nominated Kelly to serve as a United States District Judge of the United States District Court for the Eastern District of Louisiana, to the seat vacated by Judge Ivan L. R. Lemelle, who took senior status on June 29, 2015. On May 18, 2016 the Judiciary Committee held a hearing on his nomination. On June 16, 2016 his nomination was reported out of committee by voice vote. His nomination expired on January 3, 2017, with the end of the 114th Congress.

References

1961 births
Living people
College of the Holy Cross alumni
Lawyers from New Orleans
Public defenders
Tulane University Law School alumni
20th-century American lawyers
21st-century American lawyers